Live 1992 is the first live album by UK-based pop act Shakespears Sister, released in June 2011 exclusively through on digital format through their website.

Background 
Live 1992 is an audio recording for BBC Radio of a European Shakespears Sister concert from 1992, featuring tracks from Sacred Heart and Hormonally Yours. Although the concert was recorded in full, the radio broadcast in the same year omitted performances of "Break My Heart (You Really)", "Moonchild", "Heaven Is in Your Arms", "The Trouble With Andre", the opening theme from Pscyho, "I've Written A Letter To Daddy" from What Ever Happened To Baby Jane?, and "Emotional Thing". The live performances of "Hot Love", "Catwoman" and "Dirty Mind" were included on the 1993 single "My 16th Apology". The full broadcast was released as a low-quality Italian bootleg titled Back in Your Own World in 1993. All tracks were remastered for Live 1992, which was released exclusively on digital format. At the time of the release, Shakespears Sister stated they were "looking into" obtaining the rights of the full broadcast.

Track listing

References 

2011 live albums
Shakespears Sister albums